A Bamum font is being worked on by the Bamum Scripts and Archives Project to allow printing in the unique script of the Bamum language of Cameroon. In 2006, the Bamum Scripts and Archives Project embarked on a project to create the first usable Bamum computer font.  In order to do this, the Project examined hundreds of important documents transcribed in the current and most widely employed variant of the Bamum script: A-ka-u-ku (after its first four characters).  The goal of the project team was to identify the most prominent forms of the various Bamum characters, as there have been many different styles employed by literates over the years.  In particular, the Project examined documents in the script known to have been written by the three most famous Bamum script literates: King Njoya and his colleagues, Nji Mama and Njoya Ibrahimou (younger brother of Nji Mama, also a well known Bamum artist).

External links 
Bamum Font Initiative
Bamum Scripts and Archives Project

Writing systems of Africa
Digital typography